Yasu may refer to the following:

The name for Jesus in some languages including Arabic and Swahili (the language spoken around East and Central African Countries) as spoken by Ahmadis and Christians (Yasū' or Yesu (يَسُوعَ)) and Malayalam (compare to the Hebrew "Yeshua")
Yet Another Securom Utility
Yasu, Fukuoka, a town located in Asakura District, Fukuoka, Japan
Yasu, Kōchi, a former town in Kōchi Prefecture, Japan
Yasu, Shiga, a city located in Shiga, Japan
Yasu District, Shiga, a former district, now identical with the city
Yasu River, a river in Shiga Prefecture, Japan
Yasu (illustrator), Japanese illustrator
Yasu (musician), vocalist for the Japanese bands Janne Da Arc and Acid Black Cherry
Yasushi Takagi, a fictional character from the anime/manga series NANA